Drasteria scrupulosa is a moth of the family Erebidae. It is found in North America, where it has been recorded from California, Idaho, Nevada, Oregon and Utah. The habitat consists of open sagebrush steppes.

The length of the forewings is 18–21 mm. The forewings are light grey, with variable darker brown grey near the reniform and distal to the postmedial line. The hindwings are pale slightly brownish white with a dirty grey discal spot, veins and incomplete marginal band. Adults have been recorded on wing in July and August in California.

References

Drasteria
Moths described in 1878
Moths of North America